Françoise Dürr and Betty Stöve were the defending champions but lost in the quarterfinals to Chris Evert and Olga Morozova.

Margaret Court and Virginia Wade won the title by defeating Rosemary Casals and Billie Jean King 3–6, 6–3, 7–5 in the final.

Seeds

Draw

Finals

Top half

Bottom half

References

External links
1973 US Open – Women's draws and results at the International Tennis Federation

Women's Doubles
US Open (tennis) by year – Women's doubles
1973 in women's tennis
1973 in American women's sports